Lamine Fall (born 22 February 1994 in Argenteuil) is a Franceese footballer who currently plays for FC Mondercange.

References

External links
 SWIFT Profile
 
 Ligue 2: Niort.maville
 Chamoisniortais.fr
 Sudinfo.be

1994 births
Living people
Senegalese footballers
Luxembourg National Division players
R.E. Virton players
Expatriate footballers in Belgium
Ligue 2 players
Expatriate footballers in Luxembourg
Senegalese expatriate footballers
Stade Malherbe Caen players
INF Clairefontaine players
Championnat National players
Black French sportspeople